Cleveland Township, Nebraska may refer to the following places in Nebraska:

 Cleveland Township, Cuming County, Nebraska
 Cleveland Township, Holt County, Nebraska
 Cleveland Township, Knox County, Nebraska

See also
Cleveland Township (disambiguation)
Nebraska township disambiguation pages